Octomylodon is an extinct genus of ground sloth of the family Mylodontidae, living during the Late Miocene (Huayquerian).

Taxonomy 
Octomylodon was assigned to Mylodontidae by Carroll (1988).

References 

Prehistoric sloths
Miocene xenarthrans
Miocene genus first appearances
Miocene genus extinctions
Miocene mammals of South America
Huayquerian
Neogene Argentina
Fossils of Argentina
Ituzaingó Formation
Fossil taxa described in 1904
Taxa named by Florentino Ameghino